Marie Pošarová (born January 5, 1980) is a Czech politician and a member of the Chamber of Deputies for the Freedom and Direct Democracy party.

Biography
Pošarová graduated with degrees in adult pedagogy and economics at Comenius University and the Czech University of Life Sciences Prague. She subsequently worked as a financial analyst.

She became a non-affiliated supporter of the Dawn of Direct Democracy party before joining Mayors and Independents (STAN) in 2014. She unsuccessfully ran for the party in Měčín City Council. Pošarová subsequently joined Freedom and Direct Democracy (SPD) in 2015. In the 2021 Czech legislative election, she ran as a member of the SPD movement and as a candidate leader in the Pilsen Region. She received 1,657 preferential votes and became a Member of Parliament. She has also been a member of Pilsen regional council for the SPD since 2020.

References 

1980 births
Living people
21st-century Czech politicians
Freedom and Direct Democracy MPs
Members of the Chamber of Deputies of the Czech Republic (2021–2025)
People from Domažlice
Czech University of Life Sciences Prague alumni